The North East Indian Linguistics Society (NEILS) is a linguistics society that focuses on the languages and linguistics of Northeast India. NEILS focuses primarily on the Tibeto-Burman languages of the region, as well as the Khasian languages and some Indo-Aryan languages.

History
In 2005, the North East Indian Linguistics Society (NEILS) was founded by Jyotiprakash Tamuli (Gauhati University), Stephen Morey (La Trobe University), and Mark W. Post (currently at the University of Sydney).

Conferences
From 2007 to 2012, NEILS conferences were held annually, and then afterwards biannually starting from 2014. The conferences are usually held in Assam during the months of January or February.

The first NEILS meeting was held at the Phanidar Dutta Seminar Hall at Gauhati University from February 6–7, 2006. Subsequently, the majority of conferences were held at the Don Bosco Institute (Don Bosco College of Engineering & Technology), Guwahati. Regular attendees have included Robbins Burling, Scott DeLancey, George van Driem, Gwendolyn Hyslop, and other linguists.

References

External links
 
 NEILS archive at the SEAlang Library (2006–2016)
 Northeast Indian Linguistics Society dictionary archives

Linguistic societies
Linguistics organizations
Organizations established in 2005
2005 establishments in Assam

Gauhati University